William Tannen (November 17, 1911 – December 2, 1976) was an American actor originally from New York City, who was best known for his role of Deputy Hal Norton in fifty-six episodes from 1956 to 1958 of the ABC/Desilu western television series, The Life and Legend of Wyatt Earp. During the 1930s and 1940s, he was a Metro-Goldwyn-Mayer contract player.

Personal life 
Tannen was the son of actor Julius Tannen. He became active in drama — both acting and writing — while a student at Lawrenceville School.

Stage
Tannen made his stage debut in a production of The Honor of the Family with the National Theatre troupe in Washington, D.C.

Filmography

The Band Plays On (1934) - Rosy Rosenberg
Murder in the Fleet (1935) - Pee Wee Adams (uncredited)
She Couldn't Take It (1935) - Cesar
It's in the Air (1935) - Pilot (scenes deleted)
Exclusive Story (1936) - Kent (uncredited)
Tough Guy (1936) - Heming (uncredited)
Small Town Girl (1936) - Tom (uncredited)
Speed (1936) - Intern Attending Terry (uncredited)
Fury (1936) - Governor's Aide (uncredited)
Women Are Trouble (1936) - Reporter (uncredited)
Crash Donovan (1936) - Tony
When Love Is Young (1937) - Norman Crocker
Rosalie (1937) - West Point Cadet (uncredited)
The Devil's Party (1938) - Master of Ceremonies (uncredited)
The Mad Miss Manton (1938) - Drunk Who Trips in Las Palmas Club (uncredited)
Dramatic School (1938) - Student (uncredited)
Stand Up and Fight (1939) - Lewis, Arnold's Henchman (uncredited)
Four Girls in White (1939) - Doctor at Accident (uncredited)
The Ice Follies of 1939 (1939) - Assistant Doorman (uncredited)
Within the Law (1939) - Green's Clerk (uncredited)
Broadway Serenade (1939) - Assistant Stage Manager (uncredited)
The Hardys Ride High (1939) - Hotel Desk Clerk (uncredited)
It's a Wonderful World (1939) - Actor as 'Soldier' (uncredited)
6,000 Enemies (1939) - Warden's Secretary (uncredited)
Miracles for Sale (1939) - Radio Announcer (uncredited)
Fast and Furious (1939) - Radio Announcer (uncredited)
Another Thin Man (1939) - State Trooper (uncredited)
The Secret of Dr. Kildare (1939) - Bates - Intern (uncredited)
Broadway Melody of 1940 (1940) - Harmon (uncredited)
Florian (1940) - Sergeant (uncredited)
Phantom Raiders (1940) - Sailor (uncredited)
The Mortal Storm (1940) - Nazi Clerk (uncredited)
New Moon (1940) - Pierre
Andy Hardy Meets Debutante (1940) - Mr. Franklin - Radio M.C. (voice, uncredited)
Sporting Blood (1940) - Ted Milner (uncredited)
I Love You Again (1940) - Hotel Clerk (uncredited)
Boom Town (1940) - Hotel Desk Clerk #1 (uncredited)
Wyoming (1940) - Sgt. Reynolds (uncredited)
Sky Murder (1940) - Gus
Gallant Sons (1940) - Spath, a Gangster (uncredited)
Flight Command (1940) - Lieut. Freddy Townsend
The Wild Man of Borneo (1941) - Actor in Film Scene (uncredited)
The Trial of Mary Dugan (1941) - Driver (uncredited)
The Penalty (1941) - State Trooper with Machine Gun (uncredited)
Washington Melodrama (1941) - Airport Official (uncredited)
Men of the Timberland (1941) - Cafe Patron (uncredited)
I'll Wait for You (1941) - Driver
Love Crazy (1941) - Sanitarium Attendant (uncredited)
The Get-Away (1941) - Driver in Prison Break (uncredited)
The Big Store (1941) - Fred Sutton
Down in San Diego (1941) - Matt Herman
Whistling in the Dark (1941) - Robert Graves
Dr. Jekyll and Mr. Hyde (1941) - Intern Fenwick
Two-Faced Woman (1941) - Missing Couple-Searching Skier (uncredited)
Woman of the Year (1942) - Ellis
Nazi Agent (1942) - Ludwig
Mr. and Mrs. North (1942) - Train Agent (uncredited)
Joe Smith, American (1942) - Eddie
Dr. Kildare's Victory (1942) - Intern Morgan (uncredited)
Ship Ahoy (1942) - Agent Flammer (uncredited)
Fingers at the Window (1942) - Devlan
Tarzan's New York Adventure (1942) - Mike, an Airport Clerk (uncredited)
Pacific Rendezvous (1942) - Jasper Dean
Grand Central Murder (1942) - Second Railroad Yardman (uncredited)
Maisie Gets Her Man (1942) - Army Stage Manager (uncredited)
The Affairs of Martha (1942) - Mechanic (uncredited)
Cairo (1942) - Mechanic at the Pyramid / Soldier on Boat (uncredited)
The War Against Mrs. Hadley (1942) - Corporal - War Department Guard (uncredited)
For Me and My Gal (1942) - France Soldier-Driver (uncredited)
Stand by for Action (1942) - Flag Lt. Dudley
The Youngest Profession (1943) - Mr. Clark - Hotel Clerk (uncredited)
Harrigan's Kid (1943) - Murphy's Aide (uncredited)
Air Raid Wardens (1943) - Joseph
Presenting Lily Mars (1943) - Eugene Shepherd (uncredited)
Three Hearts for Julia (1943) - Reporter at Wharf (uncredited)
Pilot No. 5 (1943) - American Soldier
Salute to the Marines (1943) - Adjutant Reading Letter of Commendation (uncredited)
Thousands Cheer (1943) - Prison Sergeant (uncredited)
Meet the People (1944) - Mr. Quinn (uncredited)
The Seventh Cross (1944) - Guard at Town Entrance (uncredited)
The Canterville Ghost (1944) - Jordan
Maisie Goes to Reno (1944) - Lead Man (uncredited)
An American Romance (1944) - Auto Factory Driver (uncredited)
This Man's Navy (1945) - Red (uncredited)
Main Street After Dark (1945) - Wallet-Preparer (uncredited)
Son of Lassie (1945) - German Soldier with Grenade (uncredited)
Twice Blessed (1945) - Reporter at Airport (uncredited)
Week-End at the Waldorf (1945) - Photographer (uncredited)
Abbott and Costello in Hollywood (1945) - Casting Director / Dr. Caswell Snide (uncredited)
Two Smart People (1946) - Clerk (uncredited)
Boys' Ranch (1946) - Larry Stewart, Ranch Foreman (uncredited)
Three Wise Fools (1946) - Prosecutor (uncredited)
The Beginning or the End (1947) - Soldier at A-Bomb Test (uncredited)
It Happened in Brooklyn (1947) - Captain (uncredited)
Little Mister Jim (1947) - Sergeant (uncredited)
High Barbaree (1947) - Officer of the Deck (uncredited)
Dark Delusion (1947) - Walters the Chauffeur (uncredited)
Cynthia (1947) - Dingle Clerk (uncredited)
This Time for Keeps (1947) - Soldier (uncredited)
Cass Timberlane (1947) - Chauffeur (uncredited)
Killer McCoy (1947) - Thorne's Cameraman (uncredited)
Alias a Gentleman (1948) - Interne (uncredited)
B.F.'s Daughter (1948) - Warrant Officer Operating Radio (uncredited)
Homecoming (1948) - Airline Attendant (uncredited)
A Southern Yankee (1948) - Secret Service Agent (uncredited)
Walk a Crooked Mile (1948) - FBI Chemist (uncredited)
Luxury Liner (1948) - Ship Headwaiter (uncredited)
An Innocent Affair (1948) - Gaylord
The Three Musketeers (1948) - Traveler (uncredited)
Command Decision (1948) - Officer (uncredited)
Alaska Patrol (1949) - Dajek
I Cheated the Law (1949) - Jack (uncredited)
Take Me Out to the Ball Game (1949) - Reporter With Teddy Roosevelt (uncredited)
The Barkleys of Broadway (1949) - Doorman at Theater (uncredited)
Lust for Gold (1949) - Eager Fellow (uncredited)
Any Number Can Play (1949) - Gambler (uncredited)
Scene of the Crime (1949) - Detective (uncredited)
The Gal Who Took the West (1949) - Lee Cowhand (uncredited)
The Mysterious Desperado (1949) - Bart Barton
Abandoned (1949) - Taxi Driver (uncredited)
All the King's Men (1949) - Man in City Bar (uncredited)
Riders of the Range (1950) - Policeman (uncredited)
Father Is a Bachelor (1950) - George Willis (uncredited)
Annie Get Your Gun (1950) - Barker (uncredited)
Armored Car Robbery (1950) - Officer Johnson (uncredited)
Three Little Words (1950) - Photographer (uncredited)
David Harding, Counterspy (1950) - Radio Operator (uncredited)
Convicted (1950) - Prison Guard (uncredited)
Sunset in the West (1950) - John Kimball 
Chain Gang (1950) - Harry Cleaver (uncredited)
Three Secrets (1950) - Bobby Lynch (uncredited)
Dial 1119 (1950) - WKYL Radio Announcer (uncredited)
Pygmy Island (1950) - Kruger
The Flying Missile (1950) - Lieutenant (uncredited)
Blue Blood (1951) - Sparks
A Yank in Korea (1951) - Lt. Lewis
Up Front (1951) - Doctor (uncredited)
Insurance Investigator (1951) - 1st Hood
Santa Fe (1951) - Henry, the Telegrapher (uncredited)
I Was An American Spy (1951) - American Captain (uncredited)
Roaring City (1951) - Ed Gannon
New Mexico (1951) - Private Cheever
Show Boat (1951) - Man with Julie (uncredited)
The Strip (1951) - Arresting Detective (uncredited)
Best of the Badmen (1951) - Bill - Adjutant (uncredited)
Flame of Araby (1951) - Captain of Guards (uncredited)
Jungle Jim in the Forbidden Land (1952) - 'Doc' Edwards
Road Agent (1952) - Toll Gate Guard
Jet Job (1952) - Col. Jamison
Talk About a Stranger (1952) - Driggs (uncredited)
Loan Shark (1952) - Rourke (uncredited)
Scaramouche (1952) - Le Blanc (uncredited)
Flat Top (1952) - Commander (uncredited)
The Bad and the Beautiful (1952) - Reporter (uncredited)
Jack McCall, Desperado (1953) - Spargo
Man in the Dark (1953) - Slavin (uncredited)
Code Two (1953) - Officer Kane (uncredited)
Law and Order (1953) - Stranger (uncredited)
Raiders of the Seven Seas (1953) - Ramon
 Run for the Hills (1953) - Charlie's Co-Worker (uncredited)
Cruisin' Down the River (1953) - Poker Player (uncredited)
I, the Jury (1953) - Johnny - Reporter (uncredited)
Clipped Wings (1953) - FBI Agent Douglas (uncredited)
99 River Street (1953) - Director
El Paso Stampede (1953) - Henchman Joe
Dangerous Crossing (1953) - Ship's Officer (uncredited)
Kiss Me Kate (1953) - Taxi Driver (uncredited)
The Great Diamond Robbery (1954) - Interne (uncredited)
The Golden Idol (1954) - Sergeant Reed
Jesse James vs. the Daltons (1954) - Emmett Dalton
Captain Kidd and the Slave Girl (1954) - Steve Castle
The Law vs. Billy the Kid (1954) - Dave Rudabaugh
Woman's World (1954) - Executive Reception Guest (uncredited)
The Human Jungle (1954) - Cab driver-witness (uncredited)
Sitting Bull (1954) - O'Connor
The Bob Mathias Story (1954) - Olympics Reporter (uncredited)
Jupiter's Darling (1955) - Roman Courier (uncredited)
Dial Red O (1955) - Devon—Newspaper Reporter
Devil Goddess (1955) - Nels Comstock
Bobby Ware Is Missing (1955) - Helicopter Deputy (uncredited)
Top Gun (1955) - Torchy - Henchman (uncredited)
Blackjack Ketchum, Desperado (1956) - Dee Havalik
The First Texan (1956) - President Jackson's Aide (uncredited)
Three for Jamie Dawn (1956) - Mr. Douglas (uncredited)
Gun Brothers (1956) - Rourke - Gang Member (uncredited)
Friendly Persuasion (1956) - Supply Sergeant (uncredited)
Last of the Badmen (1957) - Deputy (uncredited)
Badlands of Montana (1957) - Second Outlaw (uncredited)
Gun Duel in Durango (1957) - Larkin - Man Stealing Guns (uncredited)
A Hatful of Rain (1957) - Celia's Supervisor (uncredited)
The Hired Gun (1957) - Deputy-Guard (uncredited)
The Tijuana Story (1957) - Miguel Fuentes (uncredited)
Jailhouse Rock (1957) - Record Distributor (uncredited)
Touch of Evil (1958) - Marcia Linnekar's Attorney (uncredited)
Noose for a Gunman (1960) - Willetts
The Quick Gun (1964) - Jake (uncredited)
How to Murder Your Wife (1965) - Party Guest (uncredited)
Fluffy (1965) - Professor (uncredited)
The Great Sioux Massacre (1965) - Miner
Batman (1966) - American Delegate (uncredited)
The High Chaparral (1967) -Shadows on the Land, Bartender
Panic in the City (1968) - Bill Rawlins
Support Your Local Sheriff! (1969) - Man in Saloon (uncredited)

References

External links 

 
 
 
 

1911 births
1976 deaths
Male actors from New York City
American male film actors
American male television actors
Television personalities from Los Angeles
20th-century American male actors
Western (genre) television actors